Chris Bergoch is an American screenwriter and producer, known for having co-written the films The Florida Project, Tangerine and Starlet as well as writing on the television shows Greg the Bunny and Warren the Ape.

Bergoch is writer/producer of The Florida Project, a 2017 American drama film co-written and directed by Sean Baker. It premiered at the Directors' Fortnight section of the 2017 Cannes Film Festival.

Early life and education
Bergoch received his B.F.A. in Film & Television Production from New York University.

Career
Bergoch collaborated on the writing of all five incarnations of the television sitcom Greg the Bunny which include the IFC and FOX versions.  He contributed songs to the Rock Opera which closed out the 2010 MTV series Warren the Ape, as well as doing some production work on that show.

Bergoch was co-producer on Dealing, a Matthew Huffman feature film which won the audience award at the Big Bear Lake International Film Festival.

With Sean S. Baker, Bergoch co-wrote the award-winning film Starlet which was  released on November 9, 2012 in the US by Music Box Films. He is also associate producer of that film.

He re-teamed with Baker to co-write and co-produce the film Tangerine, which premiered at the 2015 Sundance Film Festival and was well received by critics upon its Summer 2015 release by Magnolia Pictures.

Bergoch co-wrote and co-produced Baker's feature film The Florida Project, which was released in October 2017 and went on to receive 113 nominations, including one Oscar nomination, and 38 wins.

Bergoch co-wrote Baker's next feature film Red Rocket starring Simon Rex. Production took place in Texas in November 2020. Bergoch and Baker were nominated for Best Screenplay at the 2021 Gotham Awards.

Filmography
2012: Starlet - screenwriter, producer
2012: Dealing - producer
2015: Tangerine - screenwriter, producer
2016: Snowbird - producer
2017: The Florida Project - screenwriter, producer
2021: Red Rocket - screenwriter

Accolades

References

External links

Living people
American screenwriters
Place of birth missing (living people)
Year of birth missing (living people)